HSwMS Draken (Dk), Sw. meaning The Dragon, was the lead boat of the Draken-class submarine of the Swedish Navy.

Construction and career 
HSwMS Draken was launched on 1 April 1960 by Saab Kockums, Malmö and commissioned on 4 April 1962. She became the first Swedish submarine (but the only one in the class) to be fitted with a rubber-coated hull to reduce the surface area for active sonar detection.

She was decommissioned in 1982 and scrapped in Landskrona in 1983.

Gallery

References 

Draken-class submarines
Ships built in Malmö
1960 ships